Haptoderidius debeckeri is a species of beetles in the family Carabidae, the only species in the genus Haptoderidius.

References

Pterostichinae
Monotypic Carabidae genera